Laurence Robert Harvey (born 17 July 1970) is an English actor.

Career
Harvey is best known for portraying Martin Lomax in the horror film The Human Centipede 2 (Full Sequence), directed by Tom Six. In the film Martin is an obese, asthmatic and mentally challenged security guard for a multi-storey car park, who is obsessed with the original film.

Harvey also appears in The Human Centipede 3 (Final Sequence) in a different role than part 2. He also played alongside Tristan Risk in Jill Sixx Gevargizian directing debut Call Girl. In 2015, Harvey was cast along with Tristan Risk and Ellie Church for Frankenstein Created Bikers.

Filmography
The Pizza Miracle (2010)
The Human Centipede 2 (Full Sequence) (2011)
King of Thebes (2012)
Cool as Hell (2013)
The ABCs of Death 2 (2014)
The Editor (2014)
My Bloody Banjo (2015)
Dead Love (2015)
English Mary (2015)
House of Many Sorrows (2015)
The Human Centipede 3 (Final Sequence) (2015)
Boogeyman: Reincarnation (2015)
Kindred Spirits (2015)
Redacted (2015)
Frankenstein Created Bikers (2015)
Elephant Man of War (2016)
Egomaniac (2016)
Made Ordinary (2017)
Dark Web (2017)
Attack of the Adult Babies (2017)
House of Many Sorrows (2020)
A Little More Flesh II (2021)
Torture (2021)
Eating Miss Campbell (2022)
Ribspreader (2022)

Awards and nominations

Nominations
Fright Meter Awards
Best Actor: 2011.

References

External links

Living people
English male film actors
1970 births
People from Wigan